"Make My Heart Fly" is a song by Scottish music duo the Proclaimers. Originally released on the band's 1987 album This Is the Story, "Make My Heart Fly" saw a more complete, full-band release as a single in 1988.

Versions

Album version 
The version of "Make My Heart Fly" featured on This Is the Story was performed in the same stripped-back acoustic vein as the rest of the record, featuring as its sole instrumentation the backing vocals and acoustic guitar of Charlie Reid, and the lead vocals of Craig Reid.

Single version 
For release as a single in 1988, "Make My Heart Fly" saw a longer version recorded with a full-band arrangement.

Cover versions 
Canadian rock band Barenaked Ladies covered "Make My Heart Fly" for their 1988 demo album Buck Naked.

Reception 
In 1989, Bill Wyman of Chicago Reader described "Make My Heart Fly" as "a painted love song [...] of heroic intensity" and "one of the high points" of the album.

Personnel 
Album version
 Craig Reid - vocals
 Charlie Reid - vocals, acoustic guitar
Single version
 Craig Reid - vocals
 Charlie Reid - vocals, 12-string guitar
 Arun Ahman - drums, percussion
 Hugh Burns - electric guitars
 Ian Maidman - bass, keyboard
 Gary Taylor - acoustic guitar, keyboard, backing vocals

Charts

References

1987 songs
1988 singles
Barenaked Ladies songs
The Proclaimers songs